Ring Ring may refer to:

 Ring Ring (album), a 1973 album by Björn & Benny, Agnetha & Anni-Frid, who would later become ABBA
 "Ring Ring" (ABBA song), the title song
 "Ring Ring" (Jax Jones song), 2018
 "Ring Ring", a song by Juice Wrld from Death Race for Love, 2019
 "Ring Ring", a song by Mika from Life in Cartoon Motion, 2007
 "Ring Ring", a song by Rick Ross from Rich Forever, 2012
 Ring Ring, a fictional character in the TV series Pucca
 Ring Ring (film), a 2019 action thriller film starring Lou Ferrigno

See also 

 "Ring Ring, I've Got to Sing", a 1966 song by Ferre Grignard
 "Ring Ring Ring (Ha Ha Hey)", a 1991 song by De La Soul
 Ringtone
 two rings (disambiguation)
 Ring 2 (disambiguation)
 Ring (disambiguation)